Graniteville may refer to the following places in the United States:

 Graniteville, California, a town
 Graniteville, Connecticut a historic district 
 Graniteville, Missouri, an unincorporated community
 Graniteville, Staten Island, New York, neighborhood in New York City
 Graniteville, South Carolina, unincorporated community in Aiken County, South Carolina
 Graniteville, Vermont, census-designated place

See also
 Graniteville Historic District (disambiguation)